2003 World Junior Championships may refer to:

 Figure skating: 2003 World Junior Figure Skating Championships
 Ice hockey: 2003 World Junior Ice Hockey Championships
 Motorcycle speedway: 2003 Individual Speedway Junior World Championship

See also
 2003 World Cup (disambiguation)
 2003 Continental Championships (disambiguation)
 2003 World Championships (disambiguation)